This is a list of places in the Neath Port Talbot County Borough in Wales.

Administrative divisions

Electoral wards
This is a list of electoral wards in Neath Port Talbot:

Communities

Notable places

This is a list of notable places for historical, cultural or topical reasons:
Margam Abbey
Neath Abbey
Port Talbot steelworks

Buildings and structures
Margam Castle
Neath Castle

Covered markets and shopping malls
Aberafan Centre, Port Talbot
Neath Indoor Market
Rheola Market

Industrial estates & business parks
Baglan Energy Park
Baglan Industrial Park
Port Talbot Industrial Estate
Swansea Gate Business Park

Geographical

Rivers and waterways
Neath Canal
Tennant Canal
River Afan
River Neath
River Tawe
Bagle Brook

Lakes and reservoirs
Eglwys Nunydd

Hill and mountains
Mynydd Drummau

Parks

Urban parks
Talbot Memorial Park, Port Talbot
Victoria Gardens, Neath

Country parks
Afan Argoed Country Park
Gnoll Country Park
Margam Country Park

Transport

Major roads
A465 road
A48 road
M4 motorway

Public transport hubs
Neath railway station
Victoria Gardens Bus Station, Neath
Port Talbot Parkway railway station
Port Talbot Bus Station

Railway lines
South Wales Main Line

Railway stations
Skewen railway station
Neath railway station
Briton Ferry railway station
Baglan railway station
Port Talbot Parkway railway station

Shipping
Port Talbot Docks
Briton Ferry Docks

See also
List of places in Neath Port Talbot for a list of towns and villages
List of venues in Neath Port Talbot

List of places in Neath Port Talbot
Neath Port Talbot